Loyens & Loeff N.V. (L&L) is an international law and tax firm headquartered in Rotterdam. It has offices in the Netherlands, Belgium, Luxembourg and Switzerland (home markets), as well as representation offices in major international financial centres. It is ranked as the second firm in the European 100 ranking by The Lawyer. The firm has about 1.500 employees, including more than 800 tax and legal advisers. Loyens & Loeff and its professionals regularly appear in national and regional rankings in the top tiers. Loyens & Loeff was presented with the "Law firm of the year: Benelux" award by The Lawyer in its European Awards 2021.

History
Loyens & Loeff was created in 2000 through a merger between the tax law firm Loyens & Volkmaars and part of the law firm Loeff Claeys Verbeke.

See also
Law firms of the Netherlands

References

Law firms of the Netherlands
Law firms established in 2000
Foreign law firms with offices in Japan